Moirai was a 2013 indie game developed by Chris Johnson, Brad Barrett and John Oestmann. Described as an experimental game, although Moirai purported to be a single-player adventure game, it is revealed to the player that their decisions and input influence the experience of the next person to play the game. Moirai received analysis and reflection from critics and academics about the moral implications raised in the game. Due to trolling and a hack of the game's database, Moirai was discontinued in June 2017.

Plot 

Moirai is set in a small village where the player is informed that a woman named Julia has gone missing. Players are tasked to investigate noises coming from a local cave beyond the village. They can explore the village and speak to her neighbors to learn about Julia's story. The player is given a lantern and a knife by a lumberjack to assist them with exploring the cave. Whilst walking through the cave, players encounter a blood-stained farmer wielding a lantern and a knife. Players are able to ask three questions to the farmer: Why do you have blood on your overalls?, Why do you have a knife?, and I heard moans, what have you done?. The player then is given the option to let the farmer pass or attack them. It is later revealed that the farmer is a stand-in for the previous person that had completed the game.

At the end of the cave, the player finds Julia. She tells the player that she came into the cave to end her life. Julia tells the player that her husband had found a golden nugget whilst mining in the cave, but buried the nugget and disappeared. Her son had come into the cave searching for his lost father, and also met the same fate. Julia asks the player assist her in ending her life. The player may choose to kill her, or refuse to do so and seek help. Regardless of the choice, the player will be covered in blood. Upon exiting the cave, players encounter a farmer, also carrying a lantern and a knife, who is the stand-in for the next player of the game. Players are required to input a response to the same three questions asked of the blood-stained farmer when they entered the game. The game then ends, with the player being told: It is up to the next player of this game to choose your fate. Just as you chose for the previous player. Players are invited to input their name and email address to receive the information on the outcome of the succeeding player's decision to  kill or spare them.

Development 

Moirai was created as a collaboration between Australian developers Chris Johnson, Brad Barrett and John Oestmann. The lead developer, Chris Johnson, was a lecturer at the School of Computer Science at the University of Adelaide and a programmer in the visual effects industry, who had worked on prior projects including the puzzle game Expand. Moirai was developed over a two-month period in 2013, originally intended as an entry for the 7 Day FPS Game Jam, until time constraints motivated the developers to consider a standalone release. Johnson stated "we spent a few hours on it each week between jobs, study and other projects. It took us about two months to finish the game and we tested the game over a month long period". 

Chris Johnson stated the concept of Moirai was inspired by his experience watching the experimental play A Game of You by Belgian theatre performance group Ontroerend Goed. Described as "a game in which the rules are bent and that only become apparent as you play", the audience is invited to make comments about the appearance of other audience members isolated behind a one-way mirror, that are later revealed to be shared with the person in question. Other influences included the films of Alfred Hitchcock, whose narratives frequently involve "characters in scenes where they look guilty, and look like they're going to be framed", and the social deduction video games SpyParty and Hidden In Plain Sight. The title of Moirai references the Moirai of Ancient Greek religion and mythology, whose personification of fate connects to the themes of player choice in the game.

Release 

 

Moirai was initially released for website download and Game Jolt on November 25, 2013, and for download on itch.io on February 20, 2014. The game was submitted to Steam Greenlight on July 31, 2015, and released on Steam on 23 July, 2016. Following its Steam release, Moirai received unexpected attention, with Chris Johnson saying that "the response from players completely exceeded our expectations". Notable content creators on YouTube featured Moirai in playthrough videos, helping to boost the game's popularity, with the most popular videos by Markiplier and Jacksepticeye having 2.3 and 1.2 million views as of November 2022. Overall, Johnson estimates Moirai was downloaded at least 500,000 times, with 10,581 total playthroughs recorded.

Player interactions in Moirai were marked by a high degree of trolling and abuse. Over half (53%) of players included profanity in their responses to other players. This behavior increased when Moirai launched on Steam in 2016, with Johnson struggling to manage the high demand of the game's servers and monitoring the database of player responses, which were emailed to him directly. Johnson stated "I was surprised by (the surplus of toxic entries)...I think I was a little bit naive...Some of that comes because it's a free game and a lot of people who played it are kids. The other side...is people want to push the boundaries of the rules." 

In 2017, the Moirai server was subject to repeated attacks, including a script that flooded the game's database of player responses, requiring the developers to take down the system. These efforts were later identified as the exploits of a single hacker. Although the exploits were possible to fix, because the developers lacked the time, money and resources to address the many issues with the game, an announcement was made on June 29, 2017 that Moirai would no longer be available on Steam and its servers would be discontinued.

Reception

Reviews  

Critics praised Moirai for its unique premise and gameplay, with many writers reflecting upon the moral implications presented by the player decisions and interactions in the game. Heather Alexandra of Kotaku praised the "complexity" of the moral dilemma presented in Moirai, stating "the slow realisation that you were dealing with another player all along creates a very particular sort of reflection that can't help but make you wonder how you were perceived in turn...Moirai wants you to reminds players that very few things are exactly as they seem." Janine Hawkins of Vice praised the game's manipulation of player expectations, stating it "upended my presumptions and reminded me that games are constructed, and that construction can have a purpose beyond what's immediately obvious. We get used to mechanics that don't lie to us...Games seldom take advantage of that." Writing for The Boston Globe, Jesse Singal stated Moirai was a "strange and compelling example" of "when games do morality well", stating the game's twist "stuck with me long afterward" and made him "(think) about how choices like the ones I make...might ripple outward in real life." Shaun Prescott of PC Gamer praised how the game "forced you to assess yourself: how you comport yourself when you think no-one's listening. It tested both your reaction to some hairy moral dilemmas, while also, secretly at first, testing whether you can react without being a dick." Writing for Rock Paper Shotgun, Porpentine Heartscape disagreed with the premise that Moirai is about a moral dilemma, stating "I would call this a game about judgment. Judged for explaining yourself under suspicious circumstances (and) under the same circumstances under which you judged someone else...(the) key problem with justice (is) the ways in which people in identical circumstances can experience different outcomes. The only factor in this game is how well you advocate for yourself."

Critics also noted Moirai possessed notable qualities as a horror game, with Shaun Prescott of PC Gamer praising Moirai as one of the "most disturbing" and "weirdest" games on the PC. Writing for CNET, Mark Serrels praised the "bizarre and unnerving" nature of the gameplay. Anastasia Wilds for Screen Rant listed Moirai as one of the "best horror games that don't seem like horror games at first"." Janine Hawkins of Vice described Moirai as "wonderfully creepy", stating the game's "morbid intrigue" explained "why it has such a following among those who love unique and experimental games".

Academic reception  

Moirai received academic interest for its innovative qualities as an experimental game. The game was recognised for its emergent gameplay, as its narrative "is not pre-structured or pre-programmed", but emerges through unpredictable player decisions in a way that departs from storytelling techniques available in other mediums. Game studies recognised several innovative elements in the game's emergent storytelling. For instance, Moirai features asynchronous interaction between players, meaning "expressions and choices are not experienced in real-time", although players possess the ability to influence the experience of others after they finish the game. Moirai also uses replay as a narrative device, requiring "multiple acts of play" across players to drive the ongoing chain of interactions that sustain the narrative. 

Moirai was also praised for exploiting ludonarrative dissonance by manipulating player expectations around the consequences of their decision-making, as players are not aware at first they are participating in a multiplayer game. The revelation that these choices are not private exposes a "lack of safety" that "raises the question of how safe...choices in any game really are", given that "human experiments and interpersonal choices always entail risk". However, others have critiqued that whilst Moirai can "(provide) players with the opportunity to exercise their creativity and formulate a unique reply", the open-ended and unfiltered player responses can break players' immersion with messages unrelated to the context of the game.

References

External links

Moirai on itch.io

2013 video games
Adventure games
Game jam video games
2010s horror video games
Inactive multiplayer online games
Indie video games
Linux games
MacOS games
Multiplayer video games
Steam Greenlight games
Video games developed in Australia
Windows games